Oyster Pond is a 208-acre pond located on the Massachusetts island of Martha's Vineyard, in the town of Edgartown. It is located in the 2685-acre watershed by the same name which includes a small area in the town of West Tisbury.

References 

Ponds of Massachusetts
Martha's Vineyard
Edgartown, Massachusetts
West Tisbury, Massachusetts